Nudity in print media is a phenomenon which has existed in many countries.

Germany 
The newspaper Bild featured topless models between 1984 and 2018.

The magazine Bravo features nudity, mainly for its That's Me and Dr. Sommer's Bodycheck sections which began in the 1970s to educate about sexual health and wellbeing.

Netherlands 
From 1996 to 2006, Break-Out! Magazine was sold in the Netherlands, similar to Bravo in Germany.

United Kingdom 
Newspapers in the United Kingdom have a history of featuring topless models, this was mainly due to The Sun inventing this feature in the 1970s with its Page 3. The feature would also appear in rival publications Daily Mirror, Daily Star, Daily Sport, and as of 2022, still continues with Sunday Sport.

The lad mag in the United Kingdom featuring glamour models was popular during the 1990s and 2000s, though such titles as Nuts, Zoo and FHM.

United States 
The magazine Playboy is famous for featuring glamour models, beginning in the 1950s, to 2020.

References